Habitat for Humanity International (HFHI), generally referred to as Habitat for Humanity or Habitat, is a US non-governmental, and nonprofit organization which was founded in 1976 by couple Millard and Linda Fuller. Habitat for Humanity is a Christian organization. The international operational headquarters are located in Americus, Georgia, United States, with the administrative headquarters located in Atlanta. As of 2020, Habitat for Humanity operates in more than 70 countries.

The mission statement of Habitat for Humanity is "Seeking to put God's love into action, Habitat for Humanity brings people together to build homes, communities, and hope". Homes are built using volunteer labor and Habitat makes no profit from the sales. In some locations outside the United States, Habitat for Humanity charges interest to protect against inflation, a policy that has been in place since 1986.

The organization operates with financial support from national governments, philanthropic foundations, corporations, and mass media companies. Notable donors include AARP, AbbVie, Coca-Cola, Delta Air Lines, Mastercard, Merck, Pfizer, Robert Wood Johnson Foundation, TD Ameritrade, and Wells Fargo, among others.

Habitat has helped more than 35 million people construct, rehabilitate or preserve homes since its founding in 1976. As of 2013, Habitat was the largest not-for-profit builder in the world.

History 

Habitat for Humanity traces its origins to the time Linda and Millard Fuller spent at Koinonia Farm in 1965. The couple had a successful business in Montgomery, Alabama before they started a new life of Christian service.

Qualifications for home ownership

According to the official website,

There are several checks and balances in place to protect both Habitat and the potential homeowner:

Habitat for Humanity performs an extensive background check on potential homeowners, including character references, employer interviews, and audit of finances. The applicants are required to sign release forms authorizing Habitat for Humanity to perform this background check. This ensures that Habitat's risk is reasonable when selling a home and that the applicant family is in a suitable financial position to take on the responsibility of a mortgage.

There are typically a First and a Second Mortgage. The Second Mortgage is put in place to protect any equity that is left that is not captured in the first mortgage. The homeowners pay down the first mortgage, and after a stated period of time (which varies from affiliate to affiliate) of living in the same home, the Second Mortgage is forgiven (however, it is not always forgiven). However, The Right of First Refusal stays in force until the mortgage is paid in full.

Homeowners are usually expected to put approximately 500hours of "sweat equity" into their own or other project homes, although this amount may vary by location, the number of wage-earning adults in each family, and the recipients' health issues. This sweat equity acts as the down payment on the home. Every hour spent earning this sweat equity must be approved and signed off on by an official Habitat for Humanity representative. Sweat equity has no monetary value and cannot be 'refunded'.

Once construction on the home is finished and the sweat equity is completed in full, the homeowner purchases the home with a 0% to 2% interest mortgage (in the United States) featuring monthly payments (including taxes and insurance) that do not exceed 30% of the household's monthly income.

Mortgage payments from homeowners are deposited into a locally administered "Fund for Humanity", the proceeds of which go toward future construction. In an effort to discourage predatory lenders from targeting Habitat homeowner families, mortgage agreements require the Habitat for Humanity affiliate the right of first refusal. Until the mortgage is paid in full, a Habitat home has no equity and can only be sold back to Habitat for Humanity. Should a homeowner family decide to sell their home during the period of their mortgage, the affiliate will buy it back at market value. Often affiliates will have a shared appreciation model that will allow the affiliate to recapture a portion of the equity in the home depending on the time the family lived in the home and paid on the mortgage.

The typically no interest mortgage payments permit a family the freedom to manage their finances more effectively. Some locations require prospective homeowners attend money management courses.

Building and other affiliate operations

Habitat relies on volunteer labor in order to construct simple and affordable homes with its partner families, as well as to build community and civil society in the areas in which it works. Many churches and other houses of worship (synagogues, temples, mosques etc.) sponsor houses and provide a large number of volunteers from their congregations. Some corporations and businesses that value good corporate citizenship provide financial support to the projects and/or donate materials for use in construction. Many politicians and celebrities have volunteered with Habitat, reflecting its profile as a highly regarded non-profit.

In Tempe, AZ, Habitat for Humanity 3D printed walls for a house when not enough labor was available.

Green building

Habitat builds simple houses with locally appropriate materials. In many communities, Habitat affiliates and national offices are exploring areas of green building, including energy efficiency and sustainability. In the United States, many affiliates are building homes that are LEED certified. In 2010, Habitat for Humanity Tajikistan won a national Global Energy Award for their resource-saving bio-sand water filter project.

Tithe

Habitat affiliates and national offices contribute a percentage of the unrestricted funds they raise locally to be used in building homes by a Habitat national office overseas. For instance, Habitat New Zealand's tithe helps to support an equal number of housing outcomes abroad, predominantly in the Pacific region.

Charging interest

Habitat homeowners in the United States and Canada pay no interest on their no-profit mortgages. Some Habitat for Humanity affiliates outside the United States adjust the no-profit loans to compensate for the inflation rate in their area, with the goal that "the repayments from one house should ideally build another house of the same design".

Habitat ReStores

Habitat ReStores are retail outlets that sell new and used building and household materials donated by small businesses, large companies, job sites, and individuals. Proceeds from ReStores help local affiliates fund the construction of Habitat houses within the community. Many affiliates across the United States, Canada, Australia and New Zealand operate successful ReStoressome of which raise enough funds to build an additional 10 or more houses per year. Many ReStores cover the administrative costs of the Habitat affiliate so that 100% of donor funds can be put toward home construction and rehabilitation projects.

Ongoing programs

Habitat for Humanity International develops and supports special programs to engage volunteers from all walks of life in Habitat's mission and work.

Solid Ground

Solid Ground was a global advocacy campaign of Habitat for Humanity International focused on improving access to land for shelter. The Solid Ground campaign had four sub-themes: secure tenure, gender equality, slum upgrading, and disaster resilience. Through the Solid Ground campaign, Habitat for Humanity and partner organizations worked in 42 countries around the world to change land policy and systems at all levels of government. This campaign affected the lives of over 3 million people worldwide.

A Brush With Kindness

Habitat for Humanity's A Brush With Kindness is a locally operated program serving low-income homeowners who struggle to maintain the exterior of their homes. The program is a holistic approach to providing affordable housing and assisting communities as well as families. Groups of volunteers help homeowners with exterior maintenance. This typically includes painting, minor exterior repairs, landscaping, weatherization and exterior clean-up.

Global Village Trips

As suggested by the name, Habitat for Humanity International places a strong emphasis on building homes around the world. Volunteers today can build with Habitat affiliates in nearly 30 countries on Global Village Trips. After having gone through training, trip leaders organize travel plans with the support of the Americus-headquartered Global Village Department, first formally established in 1988. Participants from all over are then able to register for trips to their destination of choice. Teams generally number between eight and fifteen, with trips usually lasting between nine and fourteen days.

According to the website, Global Village Trips offer volunteers the opportunity:

to experience another culture while making a difference in the lives of others ... work alongside members of the host community in building decent, affordable housing ... [and] help raise awareness of the burden of poverty housing and create a true global village of love, community, homes and hope.

National Service

National Service refers to national service programs that are funded by the Corporation for National and Community Service. The goal of the Habitat for Humanity National Service program is to help local Habitat affiliates operate more efficiently and effectively by maximizing existing volunteers, increasing capacity for new volunteers and most importantly, meeting the housing needs of communities by building more houses for low-income families.

AmeriCorps is a network of national service programs that engage more than 75,000 Americans each year in intensive service to meet critical needs in education, public safety, health and the environment. Habitat for Humanity International was one of the first nonprofits contacted by the Corporation for National and Community Service when AmeriCorps was formed in 1993. In the 2008–2009 program year, over 500 AmeriCorps members at affiliates all over the country will help build nearly 2,000 houses and recruit and retain nearly 200,000 community volunteers. Those volunteers will provide an estimated 1,600,000 volunteer hours. The members themselves will contribute 850,000 hours.

RV Care-A-Vanners

RV Care-A-Vanners is a volunteer program in which volunteers travel in their personal recreational vehicles, making stops at local Habitat affiliates to assist in house construction and renovations. RV Care-A-Vanner volunteers each pay their own expenses, which may be tax deductible.

Many RV Care-A-Vanners help local Habitat affiliates raise the awareness of poverty housing and homelessness by speaking to churches, civic groups and local media. Individual Care-A-Vanners often make donations to their local Habitat affiliate and some even organize fund-raising teams and sponsor entire houses.

Women Build

Originating in 1991 with a Charlotte, North Carolina home built entirely by a crew of female volunteers, Habitat's Women Build program encourages women to make a difference by building homes and communities. Women Build projects provide an environment in which women can feel comfortable learning construction skills they might not otherwise have the opportunity to learn. Globally, more than 1,400 homes have been completed by Women Build volunteers.

Women all over the United States participate in National Women Build Week. The week-long build leading up to Mother's Day is designed to showcase the skills of Women Build volunteers and to motivate new volunteers to help families and change communities.

Lowe's is a major sponsor and underwriter of Women Build, and has generously supported each National Women Build Week. In addition to competitive grant opportunities, Lowe's offers a series of free how-to clinics for U.S. Women Build affiliates.

Youth Programs

Habitat for Humanity's Youth Programs seek to involve young people, ages 5 to 25, in Habitat's mission and work. In accordance with U.S. federal guidelines, youth must be at least 16 years old to be on an active construction site, and must be 18 years old to engage in certain build activities.

Habitat's Youth Programs include programs such as:

Campus chapters

A campus chapter is a student-led, student-initiated organization on a high school or college campus that partners with the local Habitat affiliate to fulfill the four functions of a campus chapter. The four functions of a campus chapter are: building, fundraising, advocating and educating.

Collegiate Challenge

Habitat for Humanity runs a year-round alternative break program known as Collegiate Challenge for student groups age 16 to 25. Although summer, fall, and winter break trips are available, most participants go during their spring break. Collegiate Challenge participants travel to host sites throughout the United States and spend one week working in partnership with the local Habitat affiliate, the local community, and partner families to help eliminate poverty housing in the area. Host affiliates provide housing for the groups, as well as a place to shower and cook meals for the week. More than 14,000 volunteers took part in Collegiate Challenge in 2011, making it one of the world's largest alternative break programs. Since its inception in 1989, nearly 240,000 students have participated in Collegiate Challenge and have donated more than $25 million to Habitat for Humanity affiliates.

Learn and Build Experience

For one week during the summer, students ages 16 to 18 can experience Habitat's work outside of their communities. In addition to a week of building, students also learn about the need for Habitat through educational activities.

Youth United

Youth United is a Habitat for Humanity program run by youth and for youth ages 5 to 25. It brings young people together from all walks of life to play active roles in transforming their communities. Youth United mobilizes young people to sponsor and build a house with their local Habitat affiliate.

Annual events

Jimmy & Rosalynn Carter Work Project 

Former U.S. President Jimmy Carter became involved with Habitat for Humanity in 1984 and has since become its highest profile proponent. He has been involved in fund-raising and publicity as well as actual homebuilding, taking part in the annual Jimmy Carter Work Project "blitz build.”

In 2008, Habitat for Humanity celebrated the 25th annual building project with the Carters and renamed it to include Mrs. Carter. The Jimmy & Rosalynn Carter Work Project focused on supporting the Gulf Coast community seeking to rebuild after hurricanes Katrina and Rita. Despite periodic downpours, volunteers got most of the work done during one week in June to finish building and fixing 60 houses and framing 48 more.

In November 2009, volunteers joined Jimmy and Rosalynn Carter in the Mekong River region of Southeast Asia. Houses were built in the countries of Vietnam, Cambodia, Laos, Thailand and Yunnan Province in China. The week-long project served nearly 166 families. It also began a five-year Habitat for Humanity initiative to work with 50,000 families across the five countries.

Home Builders Blitz

During Home Builders Blitz 2008, more than 1,000 building industry professionals in 110 Habitat for Humanity affiliates built 263 new homes across the United States. This was the second national Home Builders Blitz program, which was begun on the local level in 2002 in Raleigh, North Carolina. Since then, the professional homebuilders industry has supported Habitat by building more than 800 homes.

Tom Gipson, a Habitat volunteer and professional homebuilder who started the Home Builder's Blitz program, was named the "Ultimate Volunteer" in a 2009 contest by ABC's The View.

Habitat for Humanity AmeriCorps Build-a-Thon

The AmeriCorps Build-a-Thon is an annual signature event that brings together AmeriCorps members and alumni in a week long blitz build. The Build-a-Thon provides the host affiliate an opportunity to advance and highlight local house-building efforts. It also serves as an annual meeting of AmeriCorps volunteers who might otherwise lack any opportunity to meet.

The event is held across the United States and highlights a different Habitat affiliate each year. In the past, Build-a-Thons have occurred in Cedar Rapids, Iowa; the Gulf Coast; Dallas, Texas; Mobile County, Alabama; and Jacksonville, Florida.

The 2010, Habitat AmeriCorps Build-a-Thon was held in Cedar Rapids, Iowa, hosted by Cedar Valley Habitat for Humanity. This was the second consecutive year that Cedar Valley Habitat hosted the event. More than 500 Habitat for Humanity AmeriCorps National and AmeriCorps VISTA members from across the country came together to build, rehabilitate and repair more than 20 homes. In 2015, the Build-a-Thon was held in New Orleans in remembrance of Hurricane Katrina.

Home is the Key

Home is the Key is Habitat for Humanity’s annual cause marketing campaign occurring each spring. The campaign raises support through partnerships and donors, and has won several industry awards.

Other special initiatives

Habitat's Gulf Coast Recovery 

Habitat initiated a special program to help restore housing to the areas affected by Hurricanes Katrina and Rita. The effort was focused on getting local affiliates in the area back on their feet and prepared to build for their communities. It also became a catalyst for other organizations, like the St. Bernard Project, corporations and the government to provide help and support in rebuilding the area and has received considerable national media attention.  Habitat restored around 300 homes for Katrina efforts.

As part of Operation Home Delivery, housing components were assembled in nearby less-affected locations such as Jackson, Mississippi, allowing much of the construction to be accomplished while basic infrastructure was being restored. Pre-constructed components were then shipped to the affected areas and built at a faster rate. Within two months of the time of the disaster, construction had begun on houses in the Louisiana cities of Covington and Slidell, near New Orleans.

Harry Connick Jr., and Branford Marsalis served as honorary chairs of Habitat's hurricane rebuilding program, and one of the many projects along the Gulf Coast is the Musicians' Village at New Orleans Habitat for Humanity.

Habitat's Efforts in Haiti 

On 12 January 2010, a magnitude 7.0 earthquake struck Haiti just 10 miles west of the capital, Port-au-Prince. The earthquake damaged almost 190,000 houses, of which 105,000 were entirely devastated. Of the more than two million affected survivors, 500,000 are still displaced today. Soon after the earthquake, Habitat set a goal of serving 50,000 families over five years, helping them move toward safe, secure and permanent places to call home.

Habitat has reached numerous milestones after the earthquake including over 155 houses as well as another 100 houses planned to be built starting 23 November of this year. Aside from direct building of housing, more than 4,000 families received transitional or upgraded shelters, more than 350 houses were repaired and rehabilitated, more than 24,500 emergency shelter kits were distributed, and more than 12,000 damage assessments were conducted (Habitat For Humanity International). During this time, an entire community was transformed and lives were changed. More than 4,450 Haiti citizens were trained in construction techniques, financial literacy, disaster risk reduction and business development, which resulted in job opportunities for over 700 Haitians (Habitat For Humanity International).

Habitat's Bangladesh Restoration 

Habitat played an integral in the restoration of Bangladesh after Cyclone Sidr devastated 31 districts. A partnership with Japan Platform to help build transitional shelters was on-going when the disaster hit in November 2007. All phases of this project completed at the end of February 2009.

Habitat responded to the cyclone by pledging $250000 to provide technical assistance. Prior to the construction of transitional homes, immediate necessities such as food, water and medicine were distributed to affected families.

A Habitat Resource Center was built in phase one for technical planning, coordination and management of the entire project. It also served as the manufacturing and storage center for construction materials. A total of 480 houses were built at the end of a 3 phase construction process. Each house was provided with proper sanitation using contributions from UNICEF Bangladesh and HFH Great Britain. These transitional shelters were designed to be built by volunteers and unskilled workers in about eight hours on an area that had been prepared by families. This shelter provides a strong and cyclone-resistant core structure to protect residents from severe weather. Extensions to the home when the family has the financial means can be done by adding walling to the existing structure.

In bid to raise the local awareness of these transitional homes, HFH Bangladesh organized a series of training and familiarisation workshops for locals. 16 sessions were held between March and December 2008.

In total, 12 communities were worked on by HFH Bangladesh. Structures had been built in the regions of Ghotoker Andua, Andua, Kalagachiya, Pipra Khali and Mirzaganj villages in Mirzaganj Union. In the Amragachia Union the regions of Uttar Amragachia, Dakkhin Amragachia, Shoilabunia, Kismat Shoilabunia and Amragachi villages also had structures built there.

Making it Better in the Long Term with Solar

There are many projects that go hand in hand with the house building projects that allow these homes to supply their own electricity through the use of solar energy. U.S. companies such as Pacific Gas and Electric Company have partnered with Habitat for Humanity to provide complete solar grids for several homes. Other solar projects, mostly in the U.S., like one in San Francisco, as well as efforts of individual citizens are trying to make a difference by raising funds to get more solar homes built.

Who Says You Can't Go Home

The video for rock band Bon Jovi's song "Who Says You Can't Go Home" features Habitat for Humanity volunteers as well as the band building homes as part of Habitat for Humanity in Philadelphia, close to Bon Jovi's native New Jersey.  It reflects Jon Bon Jovi's dedication to the organization and highlights the importance of community unity, faith, and involvement. The popularity of Bon Jovi increased Habitat's exposure and influenced new volunteers to donate their time and money to Habitat.

Habitat Bicycle Challenge

The Habitat Bicycle Challenge (HBC), a nine-week, coast-to-coast bicycle trip undertaken to raise funds for Habitat for Humanity of Greater New Haven and to increase awareness of Habitat for Humanity in general, took place annually from 1995 to 2007. Prior to embarking in June on the  trek, participants engaged in a seven-month fundraising campaign for Habitat for Humanity of Greater New Haven. Once on the road, they served as roaming advertisements for Habitat and gave nightly presentations explaining Habitat's mission to their hosts, usually church congregations. They also took part in builds with local Habitat chapters along the way. At its height, HBC attracted about 90 participants a year, all aged 18 to 24 and about half coming from Yale University. Each rider traveled one of three routes: New Haven to San Francisco, New Haven to Portland, or New Haven to Seattle. By 2004 HBC had become the single largest yearly fundraiser for any Habitat affiliate in the world, raising about $400,000 a year. However, amid growing safety concerns, Habitat for Humanity of Greater New Haven was forced to announce the cancellation of HBC in September 2007.

Bike and Build, a similar program, was founded in 2002 by a former HBC rider. Though not directly affiliated with Habitat for Humanity, it carries on the legacy of the Habitat Bicycle Challenge.

Appetite for Construction Tour

In the fall of 2007, alternative rock bands Switchfoot and Relient K went on the Appetite for Construction Tour, partnering with Habitat while raising awareness for the organization and donating a dollar per ticket sold.

The Wall Project

Wesley College, Melbourne, is carrying out a joint fundraising and awareness program through theatrical production and is aiming to raise money to build education facilities in Afghanistan.

Criticism

Safety of volunteers 

Like much construction activity, which carries inherent risk, Habitat for Humanity construction has led to serious injuries or death to some volunteers. Habitat states that safety is a priority and important consideration on their construction sites, and that volunteers are given safety orientations and are required to work with skilled construction supervisors on the build sites. Depending on the type of operation, OSHA rules may be generally applicable to Habitat construction sites, similar to for-profit builders. In some cases, Habitat affiliates have local partnerships with OSHA on safety programs.

Cost-effectiveness 

An article in the Weekly Standard, an American opinion magazine, questioned the cost-effectiveness of Habitat building projects. To estimate cost effectiveness, all costs associated with building a Habitat home must be used, including the cost of volunteer time and training. For houses constructed by foreign volunteers, travel and associated costs paid by the volunteers are also significant. Including these costs raises the question of whether building a house this way is an efficient use of resources. Particularly in developing countries where labor is relatively inexpensive, unemployment is high, and local currency is cheap, purchasing local labor and supplies may result in an increase in the number of houses built.

Cost-effectiveness, however, is not Habitat for Humanity's only concern, and additional benefits arise from the Habitat model that differentiate it from other low-cost housing.  For example, involving volunteers in the construction of houses not only makes the homes more affordable, but it also builds community understanding, awareness and support for affordable housing and generates revenue for local Habitat organizations.  Focusing solely on cost effectiveness also does not address another important aspect—the education and training of the homebuyers.  Habitat's homebuyers are also involved in the construction of their home and the homes of others in the program. Many Habitat organizations also provide training in budget management and other skills.  These requirements, known as "sweat equity", teach low-income homebuyers valuable construction and other skills that help them to maintain their home over the long-term.  Another major aspect of Habitat's program is Habitat's revolving "Fund for Humanity."  Habitat does not give homes away; rather, in addition to contributing sweat equity, Habitat homebuyers pay a no-profit mortgage based on their ability to pay.  These mortgage payments are used to support building additional homes in partnership with low-income families, thus contributing to the sustainability of Habitat's homebuilding program.

Habitat has been criticized for its slow and inefficient rebuilding efforts along the Gulf Coast after Hurricanes Katrina and Rita. After 18 months, Habitat had completed under 500 homes. A major factor was Habitat's reliance on working through local affiliates, who are not equipped to undertake large-scale rebuilding efforts.

Work continued and Habitat completed its 1,000th hurricane-response home by May 2007. By the fifth anniversary of Katrina, more than 2,716 homes had been completed. In total, Habitat's Gulf Coast affiliates built, repaired or rehabbed more than 5,400 houses as part of the hurricanes Katrina and Rita effort.

Habitat affiliates in the region have remained some of the largest homebuilders in their areas and have received numerous awards and acknowledgements for their work in building quality homes.

Partnering with low-income families

Families are required to show an ability to pay for their home in addition to the need for housing. With these requirements, homeless and low-income families may fail to qualify for a Habitat home. Most American Habitat affiliates perform credit checks and criminal record checks on applicants before partnering with them for the construction of a home. Some critics therefore allege that Habitat misrepresents the nature of its work by partnering with families that might be considered nearly "middle-income". To address this, many Habitat affiliates in the United States partner only with families that fall below the government-set "poverty line" for their area. The current poverty rate is measured according to the United States Department of Health and Human Services Poverty Guidelines.

The credit and income requirements help ensure that Habitat applicants are able to maintain their houses. Foreclosure rates on Habitat houses are hard to measure. While Habitat claims a foreclosure rate of less than 2%, this number is unsubstantiated due to the fact that Habitat properties are not initially deeded to the buyer, and revert to the local Habitat chapter if a buyer defaults. The homeowners' monthly mortgage payments are used to build more Habitat homes.

Ousting of the founder

Habitat's founder, Millard Fuller, and his wife were dismissed by the Habitat board of directors on 31 January 2005, citing "a pattern of ongoing public comments and communications by the Fullers that have been divisive and disruptive to the organization's work" after Fuller was accused by a former female employee of "suggestive comments and inappropriate touching" during a ride to the Atlanta airport in 2003. The Habitat board investigated Fuller for sexual harassment but found "insufficient proof of inappropriate conduct." Some Fuller supporters claim that the firing was due to a change in corporate culture.

Before Fuller's termination, attempts were made by former President Jimmy Carter to broker an agreement that would allow Fuller to retire with his $79,000 salary intact; when Fuller was found to have violated the non-disclosure portion of this agreement, he was subsequently fired.

Conflicts with affiliates

In January 2008 a dispute arose between the parent organization and an unspecified number of local Habitat for Humanity affiliate organizations over the terms of their cooperation agreement. These local affiliates contended that the agreement gave the international organization too much power over the assets and operations of the local chapters. One of the affiliates, Habitat for Humanity of San Antonio, reached an agreement with HFHI in July 2008 to "continue working together in their efforts to make affordable housing possible."

By the end of 2008, the overwhelming majority of Habitat's U.S. affiliates had signed the agreement.

See also

 Architecture for Humanity

References

External links

 
 Habitat Armenia

 
Affordable housing
AmeriCorps organizations
Development charities based in the United States
Homelessness charities
Organizations established in 1976
Social welfare charities based in the United States
Sumter County, Georgia
Housing organizations in the United States